Beautiful Daughters  is a 2006 documentary that follows the first-ever all-transgender production of Eve Ensler's famous play The Vagina Monologues. It was released in the United States on February 11, 2006. The documentary is directed by Josh Aronson and Ariel Orr Jordan and features Calpernia Addams, Jane Fonda, and Andrea James.

About 
During the planning of this performance, Eve Ensler wrote a new monologue using narratives from the transgender cast called They Beat the Girl Out of My Boy. . . Or So They Tried. It promotes visibility of trans women, regardless of their anatomy.

The documentary displays the hardships the all-transgender cast had to endure in order to make the production relevant to their identity. A few women involved in the production used their rendition of The Vagina Monologues as a platform to "come out," having been closeted as transgender beforehand.

References

External links
 
 

Transgender-related documentary films
Documentary films about theatre
LGBT theatre in the United States
2006 LGBT-related films
2006 films
American LGBT-related films
2000s American films